Jón Karl Sigurðsson (11 April 1932 – 27 April 2019) was an Icelandic alpine skier. He competed in three events at the 1952 Winter Olympics.

References

External links
 

1932 births
2019 deaths
Jón Karl Sigurdsson
Jón Karl Sigurdsson
Alpine skiers at the 1952 Winter Olympics
Place of birth missing
20th-century Icelandic people